is a 1963 Japanese drama film written and directed by Kaneto Shindō.

Plot
Tamiko is a single mother who has left her second husband. Her son Toshio is going blind and diagnosed with a brain tumour, an aftereffect of the atomic bombing of Hiroshima. As she does not have the money for surgery, she asks her mother Yoshie for help. Yoshie refuses, and instead arranges a marriage with another single parent, Tajima from Korea, on the condition that he pays for the surgery. Tamiko marries Tajima and works with him in his printing business. Toshio is operated on and recovers, but the tumour returns. The surgeon refuses to operate again, saying that another operation would be fatal, and tells Tamiko to make Toshio's remaining lifetime as enjoyable as possible. Toshio starts learning braille in a school for the blind, and Tamiko's brother Haruo lends her money to buy an electric organ for Toshio. Haruo, a barman who is repeateadly involved in fights over women, is later killed by a rival. Toshio eventually dies of his illness. Tamiko discovers she is pregnant and is determined to have the baby, even if it is dangerous to her health.

Cast
 Nobuko Otowa as Tamiko
 Haruko Sugimura as Yoshie
 Taiji Tonoyama as Tajima
 Yoshitaka Zushi as Toshio
 Takeshi Katō as Toshiro
 Seiji Miyaguchi as Doctor
 Mayumi Ogawa as Madame
 Kei Satō as Dr. Koiguchi
 Kōji Takahashi as Haruo
 Tetsuji Takechi as Madame's boyfriend

Theme
Many scenes are filmed against the background of the Genbaku Dome in Hiroshima. Shindō, who was born in Hiroshima Prefecture, repeatedly attempted to memorialise the bombing of his birthplace and its aftermath in films like Children of Hiroshima (1952), Mother, Sakura-tai Chiru (1988) and Teacher and Three Children (2008).

References

External links
 

1963 films
1963 drama films
Japanese drama films
Films directed by Kaneto Shindo
Japanese black-and-white films
Films set in Hiroshima
1960s Japanese films